Konica mount may refer to:

Konica F-mount, 35mm SLR lens mount between 1960 and 1965
Konica AR-mount, 35mm SLR lens mount between 1965 and 1988
Konica KM-mount, 35mm Leica M-compatible rangefinder lens mount between 1999 and 2002
Konica L-mount, 35mm Leica L-compatible screw lens mount (M39×26tpi)

See also
Konica Minolta A-mount